Deep Spring Water is a brand of spring water available in Australia and New Zealand. It is a division of Coca-Cola Amatil.

Products
Deep Spring Water sells spring water in 400 ml, 500 ml, 600 ml, 1-litre, 1.5-litre sparkling and 2-litre sizes.

Deep Spring sells several different flavours, most of which are based on and/or made from fruit.
The flavours are:
Lemon & Lime Citrus
Orange & Mango
Orange & Passionfruit
Orange & Berry Twist
Sparkling Natural Mineral Water

References

External links
 Official Australian Website
 Deep Spring Australia on Facebook
 Official NZ Website
 Deep Spring NZ on Facebook

Bottled water brands
Australian companies established in 1981
Food and drink companies established in 1981
Australian drinks
New Zealand drinks